The 15th Parliament of Lower Canada was in session from March 21, 1835, to March 27, 1838. Elections to the Legislative Assembly in Lower Canada had been held in October 1834. The lower house was dissolved following the Lower Canada Rebellion and Lower Canada was administered by an appointed Special Council until the Act of Union in 1840 established a new lower chamber for the Province of Canada. All sessions were held at Quebec City.

The 15th Parliament of Lower Canada was elected in 1834. The general election of 1834 allowed voters of Lower Canada to choose 88 deputies, spread over a total of 46 constituencies -- four single member districts (Magantic, Drummond, Montmorency and William-Henry) and 42 2-seat districts.

References

External links 
  Assemblée nationale du Québec (French)
Journals of the House of Assembly of Lower Canada ..., John Neilson (1835)

Parliaments of Lower Canada
1835 establishments in Lower Canada
1838 disestablishments in Lower Canada